Gang In-seok (born 13 September 1926) was a South Korean boxer. He competed in the men's lightweight event at the 1948 Summer Olympics.

References

External links
  

1926 births
Possibly living people
South Korean male boxers
Olympic boxers of South Korea
Boxers at the 1948 Summer Olympics
Place of birth missing
Lightweight boxers